Gachkharan (also Romanized as Gachkharān; also known as Gachgarān, Gach Gīrān, and Gackgarān) is a village in Anarestan Rural District, Chenar Shahijan District, Kazerun County, Fars Province, Iran. At the 2006 census, its population was 279, in 55 families.

References 

Populated places in Chenar Shahijan County